The first season of the German talent show The Voice Senior premiered on December 23, 2018 on Sat.1. The coaches were the duo Alec Völkel and Sascha Vollmer of the band The BossHoss, the singer and actress Yvonne Catterfeld, the singer and songwriter Mark Forster and the singer Sasha Schmitz. The hosts were Lena Gercke and Thore Schölermann.

Dan Lucas was named the winner of the season on January 4, 2019; making him the first contestant to win the show and Sasha Schmitz first win as a coach on The Voice Senior.

Coaches and hosts

On June 29, 2018; the coaching panel for the first season was confirmed with Mark Forster, The BossHoss, Yvonne Catterfeld, all of whom have been coaches in the adult version; and Sasha Schmitz, who was previously a coach on The Voice Kids.

Current hosts of The Voice of Germany, Thore Schölermann and Lena Gercke, appointed as hosts for the first season.

Teams
Colour key

Blind auditions 
The two episodes of blind audition was broadcast on 23 and 28 December 2018 in Sat.1.
Color key

Episode 1 (December 23) 
The first blind audition episode was broadcast on December 23, 2018.

Episode 2 (December 28) 
The second blind audition episode was broadcast on December 28, 2018.

Sing offs 
The episode of sing offs was broadcast on 30 December 2018 in Sat.1. In this phase determines which two artists from each team will advance to the Final. When all artists have sung the coach decides who goes through.

Color key

Final 
The stage performances of the finale were recorded on December 1, 2018 in Berlin and on January 4, 2019 was broadcast. Only the announcement of the decision audience via televoting was broadcast live, but in a smaller studio with no presence of the coaches and the audience.

The contestants are mentored by their coach and choose a song that they want to sing in the final. In the first round the coach decides which one act remains and the other act will then be eliminated. The final round is chosen the winner by the public at home by televoting.

Elimination chart

Overall
Color key
Artist's info

Result details

Team
Color key
Artist's info

Result details

Ratings

References

External links
 Official website on Sat1.de
 The Voice Senior on fernsehserien.de

2018 German television seasons
2019 German television seasons
Senior 1